These are the Billboard Hot 100 number-one hits of 1987. The longest running number-one singles of 1987 are "Livin' on a Prayer" by Bon Jovi and "Faith" by George Michael which each logged four weeks at number one. "Walk Like an Egyptian" was number one for the last two weeks of 1986 and the first two of 1987, and "Faith" attained three weeks at number one in 1987 and one week in 1988, giving both songs four weeks at the top.

That year, 16 acts earned their first number one song, such as Gregory Abbott, Billy Vera and the Beaters, Club Nouveau, Cutting Crew, U2, Kim Wilde, Atlantic Starr, Lisa Lisa and Cult Jam, Bob Seger, Los Lobos, Siedah Garrett, Whitesnake, Tiffany, Billy Idol, Bill Medley (his first as a solo artist after recording with The Righteous Brothers), and Belinda Carlisle. Madonna, George Michael, U2, Lisa Lisa and Cult Jam, Whitney Houston, and Michael Jackson were the only acts to hit number one more than once, with each of them hitting twice.

Chart history

Number-one artists

See also
1987 in music
List of Billboard number-one singles

References

Additional sources
Fred Bronson's Billboard Book of Number 1 Hits, 5th Edition
Joel Whitburn's Top Pop Singles 1955-2008, 12 Edition
Joel Whitburn Presents the Billboard Hot 100 Charts: The Eighties
Additional information obtained can be verified within Billboard's online archive services and print editions of the magazine.

United States Hot 100
1987